Friedl Däuber (5 January 1911 – 1 May 1997) was a German alpine and cross-country skier who competed in the 1936 Winter Olympics.

He was born and died in Berchtesgaden.

In 1936 he was a member of the German cross-country relay team which finished sixth in the 4x10 km relay event.

External links
 Cross-country skiing 1936 

1911 births
1997 deaths
German male alpine skiers
German male cross-country skiers
Olympic cross-country skiers of Germany
Cross-country skiers at the 1936 Winter Olympics
People from Berchtesgaden
Sportspeople from Upper Bavaria
20th-century German people